Zachary "Zach" Dorholt (born September 1, 1980) is a Minnesota politician and former member of the Minnesota House of Representatives. A member of the Minnesota Democratic–Farmer–Labor Party (DFL), he represented District 14B in central Minnesota from 2013 to 2015.

Education
Dorholt attended St. Cloud State University, graduating with a B.A. in community development and later a M.S. in rehabilitation counseling. He later attended Saint Mary's University of Minnesota, graduating with a graduate certificate in marriage and family therapy.

Minnesota House of Representatives
Dorholt was first elected to the Minnesota House of Representatives in 2012, defeating Republican Representative King Banaian. He was defeated by Republican Jim Knoblach in 2014, and again in 2016.

Personal life
Dorholt is married to Jennifer Dorholt. They have two daughters and reside in St. Cloud, Minnesota.

References

External links

Zach Dorholt official campaign website

1980 births
Living people
Democratic Party members of the Minnesota House of Representatives
21st-century American politicians
Politicians from St. Cloud, Minnesota
St. Cloud State University alumni
Saint Mary's University of Minnesota alumni